Liam Andrew Shannon Sebastien (born 9 September 1985), is a cricketer who plays first-class and List A cricket for the Windward Islands. He is the son of former Windward Islands and Combined Islands cricketer Lockhart Sebastien.

He was born in Roseau, Dominica and is an alumnus of the Dominica Grammar School and the University of the West Indies. Liam Sebastien's five-wicket haul carried Dominica to a record-breaking 66-run victory over British Virgin Islands (BVI) in the third match of the Stanford 20/20 at the Stanford Cricket Ground in Coolidge, Antigua.
Sebastien, the Dominica captain and offspinner, became the fourth bowler to take five wickets in this tournament, as BVI, chasing 140 for victory, were dismissed for a record low 73 in 17.2 overs. The previous tournament low was 74 made by Bermuda against Jamaica. Sebastien is Dominica's most experienced player having played 16 first-class matches for Windward Islands. In another hard-fought match in Bridgetown, Liam Sebastien smashed his second first-class century to put Windward Islands on the verge on securing the first-innings lead against Barbados. Sebastien cracked 143.

References

1984 births
Living people
Windward Islands cricketers
Saint Lucia Kings cricketers
Dominica cricketers
University of the West Indies alumni
People from Roseau